Kitreli is a belde (town) in Çiftlik district of Niğde Province, Turkey. (Aksaray, the capital of the next province is closer to Kitreli than Niğde). The population of the Kitreli  was 1698 as of 2010. The name Kitreli refers to tragacanth a natural gum, produced around the town. The settlement  was founded two centuries ago by a group of families from Aksaray or Altunhisar. In 1953 it was declared a seat of township. Main economic sector is agriculture. Cereal, potato and sunflower are the main products. Although there are also apple gardens (like most other places in Niğde Province) irrigation facilities are not sufficient for a large scale production. Dairying  and weaving are secondary activities.

References 

Towns in Turkey
Populated places in Niğde Province
Çiftlik District